The 1940 Detroit Titans football team represented the University of Detroit in the 1940 college football season. Detroit shut out six of nine opponents, outscored all opponents by a combined total of 147 to 27, and finished with a 7–2 record in its 16th year under head coach and College Football Hall of Fame inductee, Gus Dorais. During the 1940 season, Dorais registered his 100th victory as coach of the Titans. In his first 16 seasons with the University of Detroit, Dorais compiled a 101–42–7 record.

According to the American Football Statistical Bureau's 1940 yearbook, the Titans ranked first among the 13 major Midwestern schools (a category including the Western Conference teams) in total offense (322.3 yards per game), rushing offense (242.6 yards per game), total defense (140 yards per game), rushing defense (63.6 yards per game), first downs made (133), and fewest first downs against (58).

Detroit halfback Al Ghesquiere led the NCAA major college programs with 956 rushing yards, finishing ahead of Michigan's Heisman Trophy winner, Tom Harmon. The team's center, Vince Banonis, was later inducted into the College Football Hall of Fame. The team's captain was Casimere Brovarney.  The assistant coaches were line coach Bud Boeringer and backfield coach Lloyd Brazil.

Schedule

Players
 Vince Banonis, center
 John Biringer, quarterback
 Casimere Brovarney, guard
 Ray Domerque, guard
 James Ellis, halfback
 Al Ghesquiere, left halfback
 Al Goodrich, fullback
 Harry Groth, fullback
 William Harrison, end
 Frank Hayes, end
 Don Hughes, quarterback
 Clyde Johnson, fullback
 Howard Keating, end
 Robert Keene, right halfback
 Ed Kukorowski, tackle
 Tom Martin, halfback
 Paul McErlean, halfback
 Paul McLaughlin, halfback
 Tom McLoughlin, guard
 John McManigal, guard
 Don Parro, center
 Ted Pavelec, tackle
 Jack Pearl, fullback
 George Petersmarck, tackle
 Richard Pugh, guard
 Ed Rice, tackle
 Meyrl Toepfer, end

References

External links
 1940 University of Detroit football programs

Detroit
Detroit Titans football seasons
Detroit Titans football
Detroit Titans football